Visa requirements for Marshall Islands citizens are administrative entry restrictions by the authorities of other states placed on citizens of Marshall Islands. As of 2 July 2019, Marshallese citizens had visa-free or visa on arrival access to 122 countries and territories, ranking the Marshallese passport 47th in terms of travel freedom (tied with Montenegro) according to the Henley Passport Index.

Marshall Islands signed a mutual visa waiver agreement with Schengen Area countries on 28 June 2016.


Visa requirements map

Visa requirements

Dependent, Disputed, or Restricted territories
Unrecognized or partially recognized countries

Dependent and autonomous territories

See also
 Visa policy of Marshall Islands
 Marshallese passport

References and Notes
References

Notes

Marshall Islands
Foreign relations of the Marshall Islands